Hergot Chapel is a chapel of the Church of Norway in Narvik Municipality in Nordland county, Norway.  It is located in the village of Hergot.  It is an annex chapel in the Narvik parish which is part of the Ofoten prosti (deanery) in the Diocese of Sør-Hålogaland.  The white, wooden chapel was built in a long church style in 2005 to replace the old Straumsnes Chapel in nearby Straumsnes.

History
A chapel was built in Straumsnes in 1927 to serve the people living around the Rombaken fjord. The new chapel is located at the site of the local cemetery. The foundation stone was laid in 1999 and the church was consecrated on 27 August 2005. In 2009, a free-standing bell tower was built next to the chapel.

Media gallery

See also
List of churches in Sør-Hålogaland

References

Narvik
Churches in Nordland
Wooden churches in Norway
21st-century Church of Norway church buildings
Churches completed in 2005
1927 establishments in Norway
Long churches in Norway